Micky Arison (born June 29, 1949) is an Israeli-American billionaire businessman and chairman of Carnival Corporation, the world's largest cruise operator. From 1979 until 2013, he was also the company's chief executive officer. Arison is also the owner of the NBA's Miami Heat, which under his ownership has won three NBA Championships.

Education
Arison attended the University of Miami School of Business at the University of Miami but dropped out to become a sales representative for Carnival Corporation.

Miami Heat
Arison has been the owner of the Miami Heat since 1995. During his ownership, Arison hired Pat Riley as the team's head coach (and later team president) and under Arison's ownership the team has won three NBA championships (2006, 2012, and 2013).

Compensation and wealth
In 2011, Forbes magazine calculated Arison's wealth at $7 billion, making him the 169th wealthiest person in the world. In 2009, he earned $7,201,110, which included a base salary of $880,000, a cash bonus of $2,206,116, stocks granted of $3,618,481, and other compensation totaling $496,513.

Personal life
Arison is married to Madeleine Arison, and they have two children. Their son Nick Arison is chief executive officer of the Miami Heat.

Arison is the son of Ted Arison, co-founder of Carnival Corporation. His sister is Shari Arison. He also has a brother named Kames Arison. He resides in Bal Harbour, Florida. Arison owns two 200 foot yachts which he uses as homes.

Awards and honors
Three-time NBA Champion (as owner of the Miami Heat)

References

External links
Micky Arison biography at Forbes

1949 births
Living people
American billionaires
American businesspeople in shipping
American chairpersons of corporations
American chief executives of travel and tourism industry companies
American people of Romanian-Jewish descent
Businesspeople from Miami
Carnival Corporation & plc people
Israeli billionaires
Israeli emigrants to the United States
Israeli Jews
Israeli people of Romanian-Jewish descent
Miami Heat owners
National Basketball Association executives
University of Miami Business School alumni
People named in the Paradise Papers